Pepe Moreno may refer to:

 Pepe Moreno (comics) (born 1959), Spanish comic book artist and writer
 Pepe Moreno (footballer) (born 1981), Colombian footballer

See also
 Jose Moreno (disambiguation)